Mud Bay is an American employee owned pet store. The company was founded in 1988, in a 1905 feed store at Mud Bay Road and Kaiser Road in Olympia, Washington on the then-rural western border of the city, above Mud Bay, the southern end of Eld Inlet.

The first store on Mud Bay Road was originally called "Mud Bay " after the previous occupant of the building, a health food store called "The ". The owners soon re-spelled the business to "Mud Bay Granary". In 2000, they acquired eight more stores and became a chain. In 2002, the company dropped the word "Granary" to become "Mud Bay" as it is now known. The chain expanded to 13 or 14 by 2004, and continued to expand through the 2009 recession: 17 stores by June 2009, 33 by 2015, 40 in Oregon and Washington by January 2017.

The conversion to an ESOP company started in May, 2014. The co-CEOs, siblings Lars Wulff and Marissa Wulff, were inspired by The Great Game of Business to do so. On August 20, 2015, the owners and employees signed a "declaration of worker ownership" at the company's annual meeting at Green River Community College. For a few years after that, many of the company's decisions were made by a team called "The 20", most of whom were elected by employee-owner peers. Since the company reached over 500 employees in 2020, most decisions are now made by the executives which work in home office, with the goal of standardizing all the 50+ stores.

It was named Pet Business retailer of the year, 2015.

Further reading

References

External links

1988 establishments in Washington (state)
Companies based in Olympia, Washington
American companies established in 1988
Retail companies established in 1988
Pet stores
Employee-owned companies of the United States
Retail companies of the United States